"On the Writing of Speculative Fiction" is an essay by American science fiction writer Robert A. Heinlein. It was first published in 1947, also appearing in Writing Science Fiction & Fantasy: 20 Dynamic Essays By the Field's Top Professionals in 1993, and The Nonfiction of Robert Heinlein: Volume I in 2011.

Advice, turned essay
When fellow writers, or fans, wrote Heinlein asking for writing advice, he famously gave out his own list of rules for becoming a successful writer:
 You must write
 Finish what you start
 You must refrain from rewriting, except to editorial order
 You must put your story on the market
 You must keep it on the market until it has sold

About which he said:

Heinlein later published an entire article under the title "On the Writing of Speculative Fiction," which included his rules, and from which the above quote is taken. When he says "anything said above them", he refers to his other guidelines. For example, he describes most stories as fitting into one of a handful of basic categories:

 The Gadget Story
 The Human Interest Story
 Boy Meets Girl
 The Little Tailor
 The Man-Who-Learned-Better
In the article, Heinlein credits L. Ron Hubbard as having identified "The Man-Who-Learned-Better".

References

Article

External link
best essay writing service reddit 2022

Essays about literature
Robert A. Heinlein